The term "patriot" is used to refer to supporters of Spanish American independence and of their governments that emerged during the revolution between 1808 and 1825.

References 
John Lynch. The Spanish American Revolutions, 1808–1826 (2nd edition). New York, W. W. Norton & Company, 1986.

See also 
Hispanic America

Spanish American wars of independence